Siberian Lady Macbeth (Orig. Sibirska Ledi Magbet), also translated as Fury Is a Woman, is a 1962 film directed by Andrzej Wajda, based on the novella Lady Macbeth of the Mtsensk District by Nikolai Leskov.

Cast 
 Olivera Marković - Katerina Izmajlowa / Lady Macbeth
 Ljuba Tadić - Sergei
 Kapitalina Erić - cook
 Bojan Stupica - Izmajlow
 Miodrag Lazarević - Zinovij Izmailow 
 Branka Petrić - aunt

External links 
From Wajda's site

1962 films
1960s Polish-language films
Serbian-language films
1962 drama films
Polish black-and-white films
Films based on works by Nikolai Leskov
Polish drama films
1960s multilingual films
Polish multilingual films
Yugoslav multilingual films
Films directed by Andrzej Wajda